Basílica de Nossa Senhora do Carmo  is a church in São Paulo, Brazil.
It was inaugurated in 1934 and named for Our Lady of Mount Carmel.

References

Roman Catholic churches in São Paulo
Roman Catholic churches completed in 1934
Basilica churches in Brazil
1934 establishments in Brazil
20th-century Roman Catholic church buildings in Brazil